The Etivluk Group is a geologic group in Alaska. It preserves fossils dating back to the Permian period.

See also

 List of fossiliferous stratigraphic units in Alaska
 Paleontology in Alaska

References
 

Geologic groups of Alaska
Permian System of North America